The sub-contrabass recorder is a member of the recorder family with a low note of FF (or F1 in SPN). 
It is manufactured in a design with a square or rectangular cross-section, which was first patented in 1975 by Joachim and Herbert Paetzold. They are made from plywood and have a doubled-back bore like a bassoon, which reduces the exterior length of the instrument. They also have wooden keys. Through this special and proprietary design, the instrument can be played with a very short bocal.

See also
 Sub-great bass recorder for an image

References

Internal fipple flutes
Recorders (musical instruments)